Linden Hill is a historic home located at St. Georges, New Castle County, Delaware.  It was built in 1836, and is a -story, five bay brick dwelling with a center hall plan.  It has long kitchen wing set at a right angle to the main house. The front facade features a three bay porch with a hipped roof. The interior features Greek Revival style details.  Also on the property are a contributing frame barn and shed.

It was added to the National Register of Historic Places in 1982.

References

Houses on the National Register of Historic Places in Delaware
Greek Revival houses in Delaware
Houses completed in 1836
Houses in New Castle County, Delaware
National Register of Historic Places in New Castle County, Delaware